The 2023 National People's Congress, or the First Session of the 14th National People's Congress, was held on 5 March 2023 at the Great Hall of the People in Beijing, China. Major state positions of China were elected in this session.

Elections

Presidential election

Election results

References

External links

National People's Congresses